R569 road may refer to:
 R569 road (Ireland)
 R569 (South Africa)